This (Is What I Wanted to Tell You) is the thirteenth studio album by American band Lambchop, released on March 22, 2019. The album appeared 50th on the Mojo magazine's albums of the year list.

Reception 
The album received largely positive reception. Review aggregator AnyDecentMusic? gave the album a score of 7.7/10 based on 15 ratings, while Metacritic gave the album a score of 82/100 based on 13 reviews indicating "universal acclaim".

Track listing

Personnel 
Personnel differs between tracks but includes the group members of Lambchop.
 Roy Agee - Trombone
 Tony Crow - Piano, Electric piano
 Robbie Crowell - Horn
 Spencer Cullum - Steel guitar
 Jeremy Ferguson - Engineer, Producer, Synthesizer
 Jeremy Fetzer - Guitar
 Matthew McCaughan - Composer, Drums, Percussion, Synthesizer
 Charlie McCoy - Harmonica, Vibraphone
 Joe Puleo - Vocal Samples
 Matt Swanson - Bass guitar
 Jacob Valenzuela - Trumpet
 Kurt Wagner -  Composer,  Guitar, Piano, Producer, Vocals

References 

2019 albums
Lambchop (band) albums
City Slang albums
Merge Records albums